Japan–Laos relations refers to the current and historical relationship between Japan and Laos. Laos has an embassy in Tokyo. Japan has an embassy in Vientiane. Diplomatic relations were established in 1955.

State visits
In March 2012, Prime Minister of Laos Thongsing Thammavong visited Prime Minister of Japan Yoshihiko Noda in Tokyo.

References 

 
Laos
Japan